UR Group was an Italian esotericist association, founded around 1927 by intellectuals including Julius Evola, Arturo Reghini and Giovanni Colazza for the study of Traditionalism and Magic. They published monthly series of issues in UR (1927-28) and KRUR (1929) journals, reprinted in the three volumes of the book Introduzione alla Magia quale Scienza dell'Io ("Introduction to Magic as Science of the Self") in 1955 and 1971.

History
The Group of UR was founded by Julius Evola. Among the first collaborators to it were also the freemason Arturo Reghini, follower of the neo-Pythagoreanism of the Rocco Armentano's "Schola Italica", his pupil Giulio Parise, and the anthroposophist Giovanni Colazza, a disciple of Rudolf Steiner, belonging to the tradition of Christian esotericism. They gathered various seekers devoted to initiate asceticism, united by the sharing of similar esoteric studies, to revitalize the perennial tradition of the ancient Sacred mysteries.

Julius Evola was the first editor of the magazine UR. The size of the Group has remained hidden but it is estimated between twelve and fifteen people. Evola rapidly expanded his influence on the Group's magazine, to the point of ousting Arturo Reghini and his disciple Giulio Parise from the management at the end of 1928. Strong personal disagreements with Parise had in fact led to a split in the group itself, after which, in January 1929, Evola founded a new magazine called KRUR.
Reghini's support for Freemasonry would prove a bone of contention for Evola, who accused him of wanting to put the magazine under the direct control of the Grand Orient of Italy.

The UR Group in fact declared itself independent of esoteric schools or tendencies formed in modern and contemporary times, referring, if anything, to a universal Tradition prior to particular doctrinal forms. In addition to Hermetists and Kremmerzians, were also accepted within it some Catholics and a significant component of Steinerians, whose anthroposophy undoubtedly inspires most of the members of the Group.
The purpose of this group was to attempt to bring the members' individual identities into such a superhuman state of power and awareness that they would be able to exert a magical influence on the world. 
They aimed to provide a "soul" to the burgeoning Fascist movement of the time through the revival of ancient Roman religion, and to influence the fascist regime through esotericism.

Operating branches of the Group were established in Rome and in other cities of Italy, the so-called «chains», based on common intentions and practices, mainly employing the anthroposophical exercises taught by Steiner for spiritual development, as well as techniques from Buddhist, Tantric and rare Hermetic texts.

The name
The name of the group comes from the phonetic expression u-r, existing in the Chaldean and in the Runic with the meaning of fire and bull or ram respectively, as well as a prefix "ur-" in German to indicate something primal, ancestral.

The magazines
In the magazines, expressions of the works within the Ur Group, the authors of the articles signed themselves with a pseudonym, because they preferred to spread their thought rather than advertise their own person. The magazine's director was Julius Evola as it appears on the 1927 cover; together with the "curators" Pietro Negri (alias Arturo Reghini) and Giulio Parise in the cover of 1928; again and only Evola in 1929, when the magazine's name was changed to KRUR.

Each of the three publication years corresponds to one of the three volumes of the work Introduction to Magic as Science of the Ego reprinted in 1955 and 1971.

Several hermetic-alchemical texts such as the Turba philosophorum, or Gichtel's Theosophia practica were published in the journals of UR and KRUR, and others of a philosophical and ritual nature from various sources.

The members 
The pseudonyms behind which the members of the Ur Group hid were partly revealed by the researches of Gianfranco de Turris, and Renato Del Ponte.
Below a list of those who collaborated with the magazines of UR and KRUR (in brackets their symbolic name used to sign, according to the idea of 'active impersonality'):
 Giovanni Colazza (Leo, and possibly Breno and Krur), anthroposophist, direct disciple of Rudolf Steiner.
 Giovanni Antonio Colonna (Breno and Krur, or Arvo), anthroposophist.
 Girolamo Comi (Gic), Catholic poet, friend of Arturo Onofri.
 Guido De Giorgio (Havismat), Catholic, first close to the thought of René Guénon, then follower of Pius of Pietrelcina.
 Aniceto Del Massa (Sagittarius), friend and disciple of Arturo Reghini, Pythagorean, later anthroposophist.
 Julius Evola (Agarda, Arvo, Ea, Iagla).
 Nicola Moscardelli (Sirio, Sirius), Catholic poet inspired by Onofri's poetics.
 Roggero Musmeci Ferrari Bravo (Ignis), whose name does not appear in magazines, however.
 Arturo Onofri (Oso), poet, anthroposophist.
 Giulio Parise (Luce), Freemason.
 Ercole Quadrelli (Abraxa, Tikaipos), Kremmerzian.
 Arturo Reghini (Pietro Negri, once Henìocos Àristos), Pythagorean and Freemason.
 Corallo Reginelli (Taurulus), first anthroposophist, then hermetist.
 Domenico Rudatis (Rud), mountaineer and esotericist.
 Massimo Scaligero (Maximus), anthroposophist, direct disciple of Giovanni Colazza.
 Emilio Servadio (Es), psychoanalyst, poet.
Other people, whose identity is unknown, signed with the pseudonyms of: Alba, Apro, Arom, Nilius, Primo Sole, Zam.
Another enigmatic name, Ekatlos, is attributable to a lady, or perhaps to Leone Caetani.
In the magazine Krur also wrote Agnostus, behind which the French esotericist René Guénon is probably hidden.

Works
Julius Evola and The UR Group, Introduction to Magic: Rituals and Practical Techniques for the Magus, vol. I, translated by Guido Stucco, edited by Michael Moynihan, Rochester, Vt.: Inner Traditions/Bear, 2001 ISBN 9780892816248.
Julius Evola and The UR Group, Introduction to Magic, Volume II: The Path of Initiatic Wisdom, translated by Joscelyn Godwin, edited by Hans Thomas Hakl, Rochester, Vt.: Simon and Schuster, 2019 ISBN 9781620557181.
Julius Evola and The UR Group, Introduction to Magic, Volume III: Realizations of the Absolute Individual, translated by Joscelyn Godwin, edited by Hans Thomas Hakl, Rochester, Vt.: Simon and Schuster, 2021 ISBN 9781620557204.

See also
 Anthroposophy
 Julius Evola
 Neopythagoreanism
 Roman Traditional Movement
 Traditionalist School

Notes

References
 Joscelyn Godwin, Atlantis and the Cycles of Time: Prophecies, Traditions, and Occult Revelations, Simon and Schuster, 2010.
 Hans Thomas Hakl, Julius Evola and the UR Group, Aries, 12, Leida, Brill, 2012.
 Hans Thomas Hakl, Christopher McIntosh, Eranos: An Alternative Intellectual History of the Twentieth Century, Routledge, 2014.
 Gary Lachman, Politics and the Occult: The Left, the Right, and the Radically Unseen, Quest book, 2012.
 Damon Zacharias Lycourinos, Occult Traditions, Numen Books, 2012.

  AA. VV. La Dimensione Magica del Gruppo di Ur. Atti del Simposio Internazionale svoltosi a Napoli nel 2017 in occasione del 90º Anniversario della costituzione del Gruppo di Ur, Ed. Rebis, Viareggio, 2021 (index).
 Claudio Mauri, La catena invisibile. Il giallo del fascismo magico, Milano, Mursia, 2005. ISBN 8842533319.
 Renato Del Ponte, Evola e il magico Gruppo di Ur. Studi e documenti per servire alla storia di Ur-Krur, Borzano, Albinea, Sear Edizioni, 1994.
 Gianfranco De Turris, Esoterismo e fascismo: storia, interpretazioni, documenti, Edizioni Mediterranee, 2006.
 Marco Rossi, Neopaganesimo e arti magiche nel periodo fascista, in Storia d'Italia, Annali 25, "Esoterismo", ed. Gian Mario Cazzaniga, Einaudi, Turin, 2010, pp. 599–627.

External links

 Issues from UR (1927), UR (1928), and KRUR (1929) reprinted in Introduzione alla magia (1971)
 

1920s in Italy
1920s in modern paganism
Esoteric schools of thought
Italian culture
Julius Evola
Magical organizations
Modern paganism in Italy
Secret societies
Western esotericism